Briscoe is a hamlet in Cumbria, England. It is located to the east of Egremont.

See also
List of places in Cumbria

References

Hamlets in Cumbria
Borough of Copeland